Livingood House-Stryker Hospital is a historic building located at Reading, Berks County, Pennsylvania.  The Livingood House was built between 1866 and 1871, and is a three-story, five-bay, Italianate style brick building on a rubble stone foundation.  The original three-story rear ell was extended to ten bays with the conversion of the dwelling to a private hospital in 1908.  A long and narrow, four-story, one bay addition was built about 1921.  It was converted to apartments in 1933.

It was listed on the National Register of Historic Places in 1996.

References

Buildings and structures in Reading, Pennsylvania
Hospital buildings on the National Register of Historic Places in Pennsylvania
Italianate architecture in Pennsylvania
Hospital buildings completed in 1921
National Register of Historic Places in Reading, Pennsylvania